El Khorbat Oujdid is a ksar (a fortified village) near the Moroccan town of Tinejdad (about 50 km from Tinghir). This ksar was built in 1860 and is still inhabited.

The ksar was completely built with rammed earth, it is walled and has a number of towers. The complex has a main alley and a number of sideways which results in a more or less straight street pattern. The house were built over the alleys so the alleys are cool.

Since 2002, the complex has a small museum and since 2004 a number of restored houses are used as hotel rooms. Furthermore, the ksar has a school and a mosque.

Ksars
Buildings and structures in Drâa-Tafilalet